Sweets or candy are confections with sugar as the primary ingredient.

Sweets may also refer to:
 Sweets, Cornwall, a hamlet in England, UK
 SweeTs or Eunice Olumide, Scottish fashion model and actress
 SweetS, a Japanese vocal group
 Sweets (album), a 1956 album by Harry Edison and His Orchestra
 Harry "Sweets" Edison (1915–1999), American swing trumpeter
 Swetes or Sweet's, Antigua, Antigua and Barbuda

People with the surname
 John F. Sweets (21st century), American historian
 Lance Sweets, a character on Bones

See also
 Sweet (disambiguation)
 Sweetness (disambiguation)
 Suite (disambiguation)